Spiraeanthemum is a genus of trees and shrubs in the family Cunoniaceae. it includes about 19 species from Australia, New Guinea, Solomon Islands, New Caledonia, Vanuatu, Fiji and Samoa. Leaves are simple, opposite or whorled, with toothed or entire margins. Inflorescences are paniculate, flowers unisexual or hermaphrodite, and the fruits are follicular with free carpels. It belongs to the tribe Spiraeanthemeae, and now includes the species formerly placed in Acsmithia.

List of species 
Australia
 Spiraeanthemum davidsonii 

New Guinea and Moluccas
 Spiraeanthemum integrifolium 
 Spiraeanthemum parvifolium 
 Spiraeanthemum pulleana 
 Spiraeanthemum reticulatum 

Solomon Islands, New Britain, New Ireland and Bougainville
 Spiraeanthemum bougainvillense 
 Spiraeanthemum macgillivrayi  subsp. kajewskii 

Vanuatu
 Spiraeanthemum macgillivrayi  subsp. macgillivrayi

New Caledonia
 Spiraeanthemum brongniartianum 
 Spiraeanthemum collinum 
 Spiraeanthemum densiflorum 
 Spiraeanthemum ellipticum 
 Spiraeanthemum meridionale 
 Spiraeanthemum pedunculatum 
 Spiraeanthemum pubescens 

Fiji
 Spiraeanthemum graeffei 
 Spiraeanthemum katakata 
 Spiraeanthemum serratum 
 Spiraeanthemum vitiense 

Samoa
 Spiraeanthemum samoense

References

 
Oxalidales genera
Flora of New Caledonia
Taxonomy articles created by Polbot